Christopher Nunn (born 1983) is a British social documentary and portrait photographer. He had a solo exhibition of his work about the Donbas, Ukraine, at Impressions Gallery in Bradford.

Life and work
Nunn was born in Huddersfield. He earned a BA in photography at Bradford College.

He makes social documentary and portrait photography. He has spent over a decade making work in Ukraine, predominantly in the Donbas region (he suffered a serious eye injury there after being caught up in a mortar attack). He has also made a long term photographic study of his friend the artist David Blackburn, and made work about a woman called Edith.

Together with Kateryna Radchenko and Donald Weber, Nunn has created a series of newspaper-format publications called The Information Front that collates images by Ukrainian photographers and photojournalists of the war in Ukraine.

Publications

Booklets, zines and newspapers by Nunn
Kalush. 2013.
Ukrainian Street Dogs. Leeds: Village, 2014. Zine. Edition of 120 copies.
Holy Water. Leeds: Village, 2015. Edition of 500 copies.
Borderland: Stories from Donbas. Essarter, 2019. English, French and Russian text. Newspaper format. Edition of 1000 copies.

The Information Front
The Information Front #1: Ukrainian Photographers Witness War in Ukraine. 2022. Newspaper format. Edition of 1500 copies.
The Information Front #2: Ukraine: The Path to Freedom: a struggle for nationhood through fifty years of photographic history. 2023. Newspaper format.

Exhibitions

Solo exhibitions
Borderlands: Stories of Donbas, Impressions Gallery, Bradford, 2019/20

Group exhibitions
''Youth Rising in the UK 1981–2021, Side Gallery, Newcastle, 2021

References

External links

Social documentary photographers
British portrait photographers
21st-century British photographers
Photographers from Yorkshire
People from Huddersfield
Living people
1983 births